Lecithocera mesosura is a moth in the family Lecithoceridae. It was described by Chun-Sheng Wu and Kyu-Tek Park in 1999. It is found in Sri Lanka.

The wingspan is about 11 mm. The forewings are brown speckled with dark brown and with a dark brown pattern. The cell-dot is small and the discal spot large. The hindwings are light brown.

Etymology
The species name is said to be derived from Greek mesos (meaning middle) and ura (meaning tail). The proper word for "tail" in ancient Greek is however oura (οὐρά).

References

Moths described in 1999
mesosura